Kuh-e Qaleh Sofla (also Romanized as Kūh-e Qal‘eh Soflá) is a village in Kakhk Rural District, Kakhk District, Gonabad County, Razavi Khorasan Province, Iran. At the 2006 census, its population was 52, in 16 families.

References 

Populated places in Gonabad County